Lost Valley is a valley to the north of Gin Cove and west of Patalamon Mesa on James Ross Island, Antarctica. It was so named following British Antarctic Survey geological work, 1981–83, in association with Hidden Lake.

References

Valleys of Graham Land
Landforms of James Ross Island